Cody Crocker (born 18 October 1971) is an Australian rally and racing car driver. Crocker won seven titles between 2003 and 2009 and with 24 wins and four consecutive championships is the most successful driver in the history of the Asia-Pacific Rally Championship.

Crocker was discovered in the mid-1990s, winning a junior development title run by Australian Rallysport News (now www.rallysportmag.com) in 1994, coupled with runner up in the Victorian Rally Championship. For the 1997 season Crocker acquired a second-hand Subaru Legacy and finished eighth in the Australian Rally Championship. Part of his $15,000 prize package included entry into Rally Australia, Australia's round of the World Rally Championship, based in Perth, WA.

In 1998 Crocker joined Possum Bourne's team, Subaru Rally Team Australia as the team's Number 2 driver and driver of the team's Group N Impreza while Bourne drove the team's World Rally Car. The following year Crocker broke through to his first ARC victory at the Rally of Melbourne. Crocker continued as Bourne's backup until Bourne's death in a traffic accident in early 2003. The team rallied around Crocker who won the Forest Rally and Rally of Queensland on his way to winning his first Australian Rally Championship. Two more titles followed, making ten consecutive for the team. Subaru withdrew from rallying at the end of the 2005 season.

Crocker linked up with long-time ARC rivals Les Walkden Rallying with support from Subaru to take on the Asia-Pacific Rally Championship which he won in his debut season despite competing on many of the rallies for the first time. Since then Crocker has remained undefeated in the APRC even while changing teams.

Career results

Complete WRC results

References

External links
 Cody Crocker website

1971 births
Australian rally drivers
Living people
Racing drivers from Victoria (Australia)